Samuel Jacob Rodman (born c. 1898, date of death unknown), was an American double agent during World War II. Rodman was employed by the United Nations Relief and Rehabilitation Administration (UNRRA) and spied for the Soviet Union at the same time.  Rodman was a member of the Communist Party of the United States (CPUSA), and his previous occupations were teaching and journalism.

Bernard Schuster was Rodman's contact with Soviet intelligence.  Rodman was engaged in espionage on behalf of the Soviet Union while working in Yugoslavia for UNRRA.

Venona
Rodman is referenced in the following Venona project decrypt:

1553 KGB New York City to Moscow, 4 November 1944;  Gif file.

References

FBI Silvermaster File, 26 December 1945, serial 356, Robert Miller background memo, Rodman section.
John Earl Haynes and Harvey Klehr, Venona: Decoding Soviet Espionage in America, New Haven: Yale University Press, (1999), pgs. 204, 223.  .
John Earl Haynes, "Cover Name, Cryptonym, CPUSA Party Name, Pseudonym, and Real Name Index. A Research Historian’s Working Reference" (revised February 2007), on the author's web site.

1890s births
Year of death missing
American communists
American spies for the Soviet Union
American people in the Venona papers
Members of the Communist Party USA